Peak Forest railway station was opened in 1867 by the Midland Railway on its extension of the Manchester, Buxton, Matlock and Midlands Junction Railway from Rowsley, part of the main Midland Line from Manchester to London. It was also the northern junction for the line from Buxton. It closed in 1967 and the platforms were demolished shortly afterwards.

This section of route is still open for stone freight trains serving the Buxton lime industry as the Great Rocks Line. The station building still survives as offices which support the large quarry terminal close by. A short section of one platform has been reinstated for railway staff use. The station is easily visible from the nearby road from Dove Holes. Although it was named Peak Forest it was actually adjacent to the present-day settlement of Peak Dale.

It marked the summit of the line before it dropped through Dove Holes Tunnel to Chapel-en-le-Frith Central.

References

External links
 Peak Forest station on navigable 1947 O. S. map
 

Former Midland Railway stations
Railway stations in Great Britain opened in 1867
Railway stations in Great Britain closed in 1967
Disused railway stations in Derbyshire
Beeching closures in England